The 2020 St. Louis BattleHawks season was the first season for the St. Louis BattleHawks as a professional American football franchise. They played as charter members of the XFL, one of eight teams to compete in the league for the 2020 season. The BattleHawks played their home games at The Dome at America's Center and were led by head coach Jonathan Hayes.

Their inaugural season was cut short due to the COVID-19 pandemic and the XFL officially suspended operations for the remainder of the season on March 20, 2020.

Standings

Schedule
All times Central

Final roster

Staff

Game summaries

Week 1: at Dallas Renegades

Week 2: at Houston Roughnecks

Week 3: New York Guardians

Week 4: Seattle Dragons

Week 5: at DC Defenders

References

2020 XFL season
2020 in sports in Missouri
2020